Mexican heraldry (in Spanish: "Heráldica Mexicana"), has no precise rules, because its evolution has been according to the ideas and prevailing customs of every time of its history.

Mexico
Mexican heraldry is based on ancestral symbology which are still venerated by descendants in Mexico. The system of blazoning arms that is used in European countries today was developed by the officers of arms in the Middle Ages. This includes a stylized description of the escutcheon (shield), the crest, and, if present, supporters, mottoes, and other insignia. Certain rules apply, such as the rule of tincture, and a thorough understanding of these rules is a key to the art of heraldry. This system was adapted to Mexican society by incorporating flora and fauna native to Mexico. Another conspicuous difference between Mexican heraldry and European heraldry is the absence of a helm surmounting the shield.

Most traditions of Mexican heraldry came from Iberian origin from regions in Spain or Portugal, predominating heraldry of Castilian, Basque or Galician, in second place heraldry of Catalan and Valencian origin. Other common heraldic traditions in Mexico came from French, Italian, German and Polish origins. The most recent heraldic influences, since 1943, are of English origin.

Spanish origins
The descent of Spanish arms and titles differs from much of Europe in that they can be inherited through females.  Also, illegitimacy did not prevent the descent of arms and titles. The great Spanish families believed that a family pedigree could be more damaged by misalliance than by illegitimacy.  Indeed, the patents of nobility of many Spanish families contained bequeathals to illegitimate branches in case no legitimate heirs were found.  Illegitimacy in Spain was divided into three categories.

 Natural children; Those born of single or widowed parents who could be legitimized by the marriage of their parents or by a declaration by their father that they were his heirs.
 Spurious children; Those whose parents were not in a position to marry. These children had to be legitimized by a petition of royal ratification.
 Incestuous children; Those born of parents too closely related to marry or who were under a religious vow.  These hijos required a papal dispensation in order to inherit their parent's arms or property. These papal dispensations were granted so often that every diocese in Spain had signed blanks ready to affix the appropriate name.

See also 
Mexican Academy of Genealogy and Heraldry
Academia de Genealogía y Heráldica Mota-Padilla
Mexican nobility

External links 

surnames.org/ 
delrealshirts.com/
Mexican Genealogy 

 

 
Heraldry by country